The GAA Hurling All-Ireland Minor B Championship is an annual hurling competition organised by the Gaelic Athletic Association for the youngest competitors (under-18) in Ireland. It is sponsored by the Electricity Supply Board and therefore officially known as the ESB GAA Hurling All-Ireland Minor B Championship.

The series of games are played during the month of August with the All-Ireland final being played on the last Sunday of the month. The championship has always been played on a straight knockout basis open to teams from each of the four provinces of Ireland. Teams that are deemed ineligible or "too weak" for the All-Ireland Minor Hurling Championship participate in the B championship.

The championship currently consists of several stages, beginning with quarter-finals and culminating in a final.

Seven teams currently participate in the championship.

List of All-Ireland finals

References

External links
 Official GAA website

All-Ireland inter-county hurling championships